Battle of the Bay can refer to:

Sports
 Battle of the Bay (rivalry), a college football rivalry between the Hampton Pirates and the Norfolk State Spartans
 Bay Bridge Series, a sports rivalry around the San Francisco Bay in the United States
 The 1989 World Series, a specific set of games featuring said sports rivalry, made notable by the 1989 Loma Prieta earthquake
 Battle by the Bay, a series of Street Fighter tournaments
 49ers–Raiders rivalry, a football rivalry between the San Francisco 49ers and the formerly-Oakland Raiders

Military
 The series of running battles between RAF Coastal Command and German U-boats in the Bay of Biscay in WWII
 Battle of Hudson's Bay, a historical naval battle in Hudson's Bay in Canada